Coleophora insulicola is a moth of the family Coleophoridae. It is found in France, Italy, Croatia, Albania and on Sicily, Sardinia and the Iberian Peninsula.

References

insulicola
Moths described in 1942
Moths of Europe